Nigel Gordon Helm Draffan (born 1 September 1950) is an English former first-class cricketer.

Draffan was in September 1950 born at Nakuru in what was then British-administered Kenya Colony. He was educated in England at Malvern College, before going up to Emmanuel College, Cambridge. While studying at Cambridge, Draffan played first-class cricket on four occasions for Cambridge University in 1971–72, struggling against the county opposition he faced by scoring just 35 runs from 7 innings. In addition to playing first-class cricket for Cambridge, he also represented the university in two List A one-day matches against Leicestershire and Northamptonshire in the 1972 Benson & Hedges Cup, scoring 33 runs. Alongside his cricket, Draffan also played field hockey and rackets for the university for which he gained a blue and half-blue respectively.

Draffan is currently the managing agent for Savills of the Angmering Park estate near Arundel, having previously been estate director for the Goodwood Estate. He is also a trustee of the Arundel Castle Cricket Foundation.

References

External links

1950 births
Living people
People from Nakuru
People educated at Malvern College
Alumni of Emmanuel College, Cambridge
English cricketers
Cambridge University cricketers
British estate agents (people)